Field Marshal His Highness Shree Shree Shree Maharaja Sir Padma Shumsher Jung Bahadur Rana   (5 December 1882 – Calcutta, India, 11 April 1961) was the hereditary prime minister of Nepal and Maharaja of Lamjung and Kaski from 29 November 1945 to 30 April 1948 as the head of the Rana dynasty. He was one of the first prime ministers of Nepal in over a century to advocate for social development, and even proclaimed himself to be "A servant of the nation".

Reforms

In his short tenure as the Prime minister, he performed numerous reforms in Nepal including: -
 He began construction of the first east-west highway in Nepal. The highway was mainly intended to expedite the transport of mail and is also sometimes called Postal Highway. 
 Citing the lack of proper education in Nepal, he sent several teachers to various countries abroad to train. In addition, he also established several schools and college including Padmodaya high school and Padma Kanya multiple campus, which was also the first college to be established in Nepal for women.
 He held the first ever election in the history of Nepal in the form of a municipal election. 
 He introduced the Government Act of Nepal in 26, January, 1948, although it was never fully implemented.

Retirement

His liberal views and acts of reformation had led him to be threatened by his own family and hence, fearing for his life, he left for India on March 1, 1948 under the pretext of having a medical examination. There he met Indian president Jawaharlal Nehru, who encouraged him to establish democracy in Nepal, but he decided to stay in India and not risk himself by returning to Nepal. He officially resigned from his position on 28 April, 1948.  Only after the fall of the Rana regime in 1951, did he occasionally visit Nepal. He remained in Calcutta until his death in 1961.

Works

References

|-

1882 births
1961 deaths
Chief Commanders of the Legion of Merit
Knights Grand Cross of the Order of the British Empire
Knights Grand Commander of the Order of the Star of India
Knights Grand Commander of the Order of the Indian Empire
Prime ministers of Nepal
Rana dynasty
Rana regime
Recipients of the Order of the Sacred Tripod
20th-century prime ministers of Nepal
19th-century Nepalese nobility
20th-century Nepalese nobility
Children of prime ministers of Nepal
Nepalese Hindus